Ahmad Daifallah Al-Azeib is a Yemeni diplomat.  He served as ambassador of Yemen to Oman until 1997 and then to Saudi Arabi.

References

Yemeni diplomats
Ambassadors of Yemen to Oman
Ambassadors of Yemen to Saudi Arabia
Living people
Year of birth missing (living people)